Rav Wilding (born 16 October 1977) is a British television presenter and former police officer who served with the British Transport Police and Metropolitan Police Service. Prior to joining the police, Wilding served in the British Army and worked as a security guard at Harrods department store in London. He is best known for his role as a presenter on the BBC TV show Crimewatch.

Early life and education
Born in Canterbury, Kent, Wilding is the second of five children born to a Mauritian father and an English mother who were both nurses. He attended Fulston Manor School in Sittingbourne, Kent.

After a family breakup, Wilding had to leave home at a young age due to social housing not being willing to accommodate him with his mother and younger siblings after he had turned 16. After completing an apprenticeship in dry lining, he then opted to join the military aged 17.

Military and police career
After secondary school, he took an apprenticeship in construction before joining the British Army at seventeen.   After sustaining a serious leg break, Wilding was forced to leave the Army after only 4 years.

Upon leaving the army in 1999, Wilding started working at Harrods in Knightsbridge as part of the security team. After approximately nine months at Harrods, Wilding's application to join the Metropolitan Police Service was accepted and he started training school. Wilding joined the Service on the 22 May 2000 and was posted to Peckham in South London. While based at Peckham in Southwark, he was involved in the high-profile police investigation surrounding the death of Damilola Taylor. Wilding was part of a specialist unit specifically created in the aftermath of the murder where he worked on the tough North Peckham Estate where Taylor was killed.

After two years as a policeman, he responded to an advert for people to participate in a jungle adventure, to live for three months in an Australian rain forest for a new television programme on Channel 4 called Eden. After numerous auditions and around 50,000 applicants Wilding was picked for the programme and flew to New South Wales.

After three months in the jungle, Wilding returned to Britain and went back to work in the police but this time in to the CID. Working within CID, Wilding was posted to units focusing on robbery, burglary and major investigations as well as a long spell working on a Sapphire unit dealing with rape and sexual assault allegations. He was eventually selected for Detective training and became a Detective Constable for the last six years of his service. Wilding worked on many high-profile cases that appeared at the Old Bailey.

In January 2021, it was announced by Chief Superintendent Martin Fry that Wilding had joined British Transport Police as a detective.

Television career
Wilding had to go through numerous interviews and auditions as well as formal television presenter training. Having also auditioned for Blue Peter, he was offered a part on BBC Crimewatch, which he has appeared on since 2004. After taking a period of unpaid leave, Wilding resigned from the police force in February 2008 to concentrate on TV work.

Wilding is a regular reporter on crime issues for BBC One's The One Show. Since 21 April 2008, Wilding has co-presented a new programme called Missing Live, shown every weekday morning on BBC One. In August 2008, he hosted the twenty-episode fly-on-the-wall series following the lives of the Yorkshire Air Ambulance, Helicopter Heroes on BBC One. He has also fronted two series of the daily live show Crimewatch Roadshow for BBC One and will present the third series in June 2011.

In January 2008, he won a celebrity edition of The Weakest Link and Ready Steady Cook. On 29 December 2008, Wilding appeared on Celebrity Mastermind. His specialist subject was The Human Body. He came last with only fifteen points. In 2011 he took a role on CBBC as co-presenter and dunk tester for Dave Benson Phillips in the remake of Get Your Own Back.

In August 2009, Wilding was revealed as one of the contestants in Strictly Come Dancing and was partnered with Aliona Vilani. Wilding was made fourth favourite by bookmakers behind former boxer Joe Calzaghe and actor Ricky Whittle, however he became the third celebrity to be eliminated on the show after failing to be saved in the dance-off, on 3 October 2009.

He appeared several times on Big Brother spin off show Big Brother's Little Brother in 2010.

In September 2010, Wilding went to the front line of British Military operations in Afghanistan filming a series for BBC called Remembrance Week. Whilst filming he witnessed a bomb blast that killed one of the serving soldiers with the unit he was filming (The second Battalion the Duke of Lancasters Regiment) The Lions of England. The series focused on both past and present conflicts.

Since February 2011, Wilding has been a host of the CBBC show Cop School, educating the youth on how to be a police officer. It was renamed Hero Squad in 2012 and the second series, looking at other emergency services' including the police, aired in October 2012. In March 2011, he presented the BBC fly-on-the-wall documentary series Neighbourhood Blues which focuses on how the police help communities and how they fight crime.

In September 2011, Wilding took part in and went on to win the second series of ITV's 71 Degrees North, where ten celebrity contestants must battle it out to see who will make it to the 71st parallel north, with challenges along the way.

In August 2011, Wilding hosted a Crimewatch special on the riots in England.

On 15 December 2011, Kirsty Young, Wilding's Crimewatch co-host, stated that it would be his last show. Since June 2009, Wilding presents accompanying series, Crimewatch Roadshow, every morning live on BBC1. Series 4 aired in June/July 2012.

On 13 August 2012, Wilding started a new series called Frontline Police. In the series he joins the Essex Police force and goes back to his roots of when he was in the Metropolitan Police. The show currently airs every Monday at 8pm on Channel 5.

Wilding presents Crime Scene Rescue on BBC One; the show began on 15 April 2013.

In December 2013, he became a contestant in the third series of the diving reality show Splash!.

He took part in an episode of Tipping Point: Lucky Stars on ITV, in which he set the record for the most counters dropped in a single go in any episode of Tipping Point, sinking 23 counters (for a total of £2,300).

He appeared on Season 5 on Hacker Time.

In 2016, he presented a three-part series for ID called British Police Murdered on Duty, telling the stories of the Shepherd's Bush murders, as well as murderers Dale Cregan and David Bieber.

In 2016, he filmed a five-part series for BBC One called Ill Gotten Gains following police and proceeds of crime experts seize criminals assets after conviction and watch them auctioned off to raise money for the public phrase. He co-presented alongside Angellica Bell. He presented Christmas City for BBC One daytime in December 2016.

Personal life
Wilding was in a relationship with English television personality and glamour model Chantelle Houghton. The couple separated in 2011. Wilding began a relationship with Loose Women's producer Jill Morgan in 2012. The couple married in 2017.

Wilding revealed on Morning Live that he is dyslexic, dyspraxic and also had been diagnosed by Simon Baron-Cohen as autistic in a film broadcast on the subject.

Filmography
TV
Crimewatch (2004–2011) – Presenter
Missing Live (2008–2010) – Co-presenter
Helicopter Heroes (2008–2014) – Presenter
Strictly Come Dancing (2009) – Participant
Crimewatch Roadshow (2009–present) – Presenter
Remembrance Week (2010) – Presenter 
Get Your Own Back (2011) – Co-presenter
71 Degrees North (2011) – Participant 
Cop School (2011) – Presenter
Neighbourhood Blues (2011) – Presenter
Frontline Police (2012–?) – Presenter
Hero Squad (2012–present) – Presenter
Crime Scene Rescue (2013) – Presenter
Splash! (2013) – Participant 
British Police Murdered on Duty (2016) – Narrator
Ill Gotten Gains (2016) – Co-presenter
Christmas City (2016) – Presenter
The All New Monty - Who Bares Wins (2019) – Participant
Richard Osman's House of Games (2020) – Participant
Frontline Fightback (2021–present) – Narrator
Morning Live presenter/expert
Scam Interceptors (2022) – presenter
Car Crime: How Safe Is Your Car? (2022) – Presenter

References

External links
Rav Wilding Official website

Presenters BBC Crimewatch

1977 births
Living people
Anglo-Indian people
English people of Mauritian descent
English television presenters
Metropolitan Police officers
People from Canterbury
People educated at Fulston Manor School
Television presenters with dyslexia